Dremelspitze is a mountain in the Lechtal Alps of Tyrol, Austria.

Mountains of Tyrol (state)
Lechtal Alps
Mountains of the Alps